Sorbs (also known as Lusatians, Lusatian Serbs and Wends) are an indigenous West Slavic ethnic group predominantly inhabiting the parts of Lusatia located in the German states of Saxony and Brandenburg. Sorbs traditionally speak the Sorbian languages (also known as "Wendish" and "Lusatian"), which are closely related to Czech, Polish, Kashubian, Silesian, and Slovak. Upper Sorbian and Lower Sorbian are officially recognized minority languages in Germany.

Due to a gradual and increasing assimilation between the 17th and 20th centuries, virtually all Sorbs also spoke German by the early 20th century. In the newly created German nation state of the late 19th and early 20th centuries, policies were implemented in an effort to Germanize the Sorbs. These policies reached their climax under the Nazi regime, who denied the existence of the Sorbs as a distinct Slavic people by referring to them as "Sorbian-speaking Germans". The community is divided religiously between Roman Catholicism (the majority) and Lutheranism. The former Minister President of Saxony, Stanislaw Tillich, is of Sorbian origin.

Etymology

The ethnonym "Sorbs" (Serbja, Serby) derives from the medieval ethnic groups called "Sorbs" (Surbi, Sorabi). The original ethnonym, Srbi, was retained by the Sorbs and Serbs in the Balkans. By the 6th century, Slavs occupied the area west of the Oder formerly inhabited by Germanic peoples. The Sorbs are first mentioned in the 6th or 7th century. In their languages, the other Slavs call them the "Lusatian Serbs", and the Sorbs call the Serbs "the south Sorbs". The name "Lusatia" was originally applied only to Lower Lusatia. It is generally considered that their ethnonym *Sŕbъ (plur. *Sŕby) originates from Proto-Slavic with an appellative meaning of a "family kinship" and "alliance", however others argue a derivation from Iranian-Sarmatian.

Early History

Early Middle Ages

It is considered that their name can be traced to the 6th century or earlier when Vibius Sequester recorded Cervetiis (Servetiis) living on the other part of the river Elbe which divided them from the Suevi (Albis Germaniae Suevos a Cerveciis dividiit). According to Lubor Niederle, the Serbian district was located somewhere between Magdeburg and Lusatia, and was later mentioned by the Ottonians as Ciervisti,  Zerbisti, and Kirvisti. The information is in accordance with the Frankish 7th-century Chronicle of Fredegar according to which the Surbi lived in the Saale-Elbe valley, having settled in the Thuringian part of Francia since the second half of the 6th century or beginning of the 7th century and were vassals of the Merovingian dynasty. The Saale-Elbe line marked the approximate limit of Slavic westward migration. Under the leadership of dux (duke) Dervan ("Dervanus dux gente Surbiorum que ex genere Sclavinorum"), they joined the Slavic tribal union of Samo, after Samo's decisive victory against Frankish King Dagobert I in 631. Afterwards, these Slavic tribes continuously raided Thuringia. The fate of the tribes after Samo's death and dissolution of the union in 658 is undetermined, but it is considered that they subsequently returned to Frankish vassalage. According to a 10th-century source De Administrando Imperio, they lived "since the beginning" in the region called by them as Boiki which was a neighbor to Francia, and when two brothers succeeded their father, one of them migrated with half of the people to the Balkans during the rule of Heraclius in the first half of the 7th century. According to some scholars, the White Serbian Unknown Archon who led them to the Balkans was most likely a son, brother or other relative of Dervan.

Sorbian tribes, including Surbi, are noted in the mid-9th-century work of the Bavarian Geographer. Having settled by the Elbe, Saale, Spree, and Neisse in the 6th and early 7th century, Sorbian tribes divided into two main groups, which have taken their names from the characteristics of the area where they had settled. The two groups were separated from each other by a wide and uninhabited forest range, one around Upper Spree and the rest between the Elbe and Saale. However, others emphasize differences between these two dialects and that their respective territories correspond to two different Slavic archeological cultures of Tornow group ceramics (Lower Sorbian language) and Leipzig group ceramics (Upper Sorbian language), both a derivation of Prague(-Korchak) culture.

The Annales Regni Francorum state that in 806 Sorbian Duke Miliduch fought against the Franks and was killed. In 840, Sorbian Duke Czimislav was killed. In 932, Henry I conquered Lusatia and Milsko. Gero, Margrave of the Saxon Ostmark, reconquered Lusatia the following year and, in 939, murdered 30 Sorbian princes during a feast. As a result, there were many Sorbian uprisings against German rule. A reconstructed castle, at Raddusch in Lower Lusatia, is the sole physical remnant from this early period.

High and Late Middle Ages
During the reign of Boleslaw I of Poland in 1002–1018, three Polish-German wars were waged which caused Lusatia to come under the domination of new rulers. In 1018, on the strength of peace in Bautzen, Lusatia became a part of Poland; but, it returned to German rule before 1031.  However, this German rule is not to be understood in a national sense. At that time, Lusatia (along with Silesia) was part of Bohemia which itself was part of the Roman-German Empire but was ruled by a powerful indigenous Slavic dynasty. There was a dense network of dynastic and diplomatic relations between German and Slavic feudal lords, e.g. Wiprecht of Groitzsch (a German) rose to power through close links with the Bohemian king and his marriage into Slavic nobility. The Slavic-governed Bohemia remained a loyal and politically influential member of the Roman-German Empire but was in a constant power-struggle with neighbouring Poland. From the 11th to the 15th century, agriculture in Lusatia developed and colonization by Frankish, Flemish and Saxon settlers intensified. This can still be seen today from the names of local villages which geographically form a patchwork of typical German (ending on -dorf, -thal etc.) and typical Slavic origin (ending on -witz, -ow etc.), indicating the language originally spoken by its inhabitants. In 1327 the first prohibitions on using Sorbian before courts and in administrative affairs in the cities of Altenburg, Zwickau and Leipzig appeared. Speaking Sorbian in family and business contexts was, however, not banned, as it did not involve the functioning of the administration. Also the village communities and the village administration usually kept operating in Sorbian.

Early modern period

Between 1376 and 1635 Lusatia was part of the Lands of the Bohemian Crown, under the rule of the Luxembourgs, Habsburgs and other kings. From the beginning of the 16th century the whole Sorbian-inhabited area, with the exception of Lusatia, underwent Germanization. In 1635 Lusatia became a fiefdom of Saxon electors, but it retained a considerable autonomy and largely its own legal system (see Lusatian League). The Thirty Years' War and the plague of the 17th century caused terrible devastation in Lusatia. This led to further German colonization and Germanization.

In 1667 the Prince of Brandenburg, Frederick Wilhelm, ordered the immediate destruction of all Sorbian printed materials and banned saying masses in this language. At the same time the Evangelical Church supported printing Sorbian religious literature as a means of fighting the Counterreformation. In 1706 the Sorbian Seminary, the main centre for the education of Sorbian Catholic priests, was founded in Prague. Evangelical students of theology formed the Sorbian College of Ministers.

Late modern period
The Congress of Vienna, in 1815, gave part of Upper Lusatia to Saxony, but most of Lusatia to Prussia. More and more bans on the use of Sorbian languages appeared from then until 1835 in Saxony and Prussia; emigration of the Sorbs, mainly to the town of Serbin in Texas and to Australia, increased. In 1848, 5000 Sorbs signed a petition to the Saxon Government, in which they demanded equality for the Sorbian language with the German one in churches, courts, schools and Government departments. From 1871 the whole of Lusatia became a part of united Germany and was divided between two parts; Prussia (Silesia and Brandenburg), and Saxony.

In 1871 the industrialization of the region and German immigration began; official Germanization intensified. Although the Weimar Republic guaranteed constitutional minority rights, it did not practice them.

During World War I, one of the most venerated Serbian generals was Pavle Jurišić Šturm (Paul Sturm), a Sorb from Görlitz, Province of Silesia.

Contemporary History

Throughout the Third Reich, Sorbians were described as a German tribe who spoke a Slavic language and their national poet Handrij Zejler was German. Sorbian costume, culture, customs, and the language was said to be no indication of a non-German origin. The Reich declared that there were truly no "Sorbs" or "Lusatians", only Wendish-speaking Germans. As such, while the Sorbs were largely safe from the Reich's policies of ethnic cleansing, the cultivation of "Wendish" customs and traditions was to be encouraged in a controlled manner and it was expected that the Slavic language would decline due to natural causes. Young Sorbs enlisted in the Wehrmacht and were sent to the front. The entangled lives of the Sorbs during World War II are exemplified by the life stories of Mina Witkojc,  and Jan Skala.

East Germany

The first Lusatian cities were captured in April 1945, when the Red Army and the Polish Second Army crossed the river Queis (Kwisa). The defeat of Nazi Germany changed the Sorbs’ situation considerably. The regions in East Germany (the German Democratic Republic) faced heavy industrialisation and a large influx of expelled Germans. The East German authorities tried to counteract this development by creating a broad range of Sorbian institutions. The Sorbs were officially recognized as an ethnic minority, more than 100 Sorbian schools and several academic institutions were founded, the Domowina and its associated societies were re-established and a Sorbian theatre was created. Owing to the suppression of the church and forced collectivization, however, these efforts were severely affected and consequently over time the number of people speaking Sorbian languages decreased by half.

However, the relationship between the Sorbs and the government of East Germany was not without occasional difficulties, mainly because of the high levels of religious observance and resistance to the nationalisation of agriculture. During the compulsory collectivization campaign, a great many unprecedented incidents were reported. Thus, throughout the Uprising of 1953 in East Germany, violent clashes with the police were reported in Lusatia. A small uprising took place in three upper communes of Błot.

Nevertheless, Sorbs experienced greater representation in the German Democratic Republic than under any other German government. Domowina had status as a constituent member organization of the National Front, and a number of Sorbs were members of the Volkskammer and State Council of East Germany. Notable Sorbian figures of the period include Domowina Chairmen Jurij Grós and Kurt Krjeńc, State Council member Maria Schneider, and writer and three-time receipient of the National Prize of the German Democratic Republic Jurij Brězan. In 1973, Domowina reported that 2,130 municipal councillors, 119 burgomasters, and more than 3,500 members of commissions and local bodies in East Germany were ethnic Sorbs registered with the organization. Additionally, there was a seat reserved for a Sorbian representative in the Central Council of the Free German Youth, the mass organization for young people in East Germany, and magazines for both the FDJ and the Ernst Thälmann Pioneer Organisation were published in the Sorbian language on a regular basis under the titles Chorhoj Měra and Plomjo, respectively.

After reunification
After the reunification of Germany on 3 October 1990, Lusatians made efforts to create an autonomous administrative unit; however, Helmut Kohl’s government did not agree to it.   After 1989, the Sorbian movement revived, however, it still encounters many obstacles. Although Germany supports national minorities, Sorbs claim that their aspirations are not sufficiently fulfilled.  The desire to unite Lusatia in one of the federal states has not been taken into consideration. Upper Lusatia still belongs to Saxony and Lower Lusatia to Brandenburg.  Liquidations of Sorbian schools, even in areas mostly populated by Sorbs, still happen, under the pretext of financial difficulties or demolition of whole villages to create lignite quarries.

Faced with growing threat of cultural extinction, the Domowina issued a memorandum in March 2008 and called for "help and protection against the growing threat of their cultural extinction, since an ongoing conflict between the German government, Saxony and Brandenburg about the financial distribution of help blocks the financing of almost all Sorbian institutions". The memorandum also demands a reorganisation of competence by ceding responsibility from the Länder to the federal government and an expanded legal status. The call has been issued to all governments and heads of state of the European Union.

On 28 May 2008, the Sorbian politician Stanislaw Tillich, member of the governing Christian Democrats, was elected Premier of the State of Saxony.

Population genetics 
According to 2013 and 2015 studies, the most common Y-DNA haplogroup among the Sorbs who speak Upper Sorbian in Lusatia (n=123) is R1a, mainly its R-M458 subclade (57%), which is carried by 65% of the Sorb males. It is followed in frequency by I1 (9.8%), R1b (9.8%), E1b1b (4.9%), I2 (4.1%), J (3.3%) and G (2.4%). Other haplogroups are less than 1%. A study from 2003 reported a similar frequency of 63.4% of haplogroup R1a among Sorbian males (n=112). Other studies that covered aspects of Sorbian Y-DNA include Immel et al. 2006, Rodig et al. 2007, and Krawczak et al. 2008. A 2011 paper on the Sorbs' autosomal DNA reported that the Upper Sorbian speakers (n=289) showed the greatest autosomal genetic similarity to Poles, followed by Czechs and Slovaks, consistent with the linguistic proximity of Sorbian to other West Slavic languages. In another genome-wide paper from the same year on Upper Sorbs (n=977), which indicated their genetic isolation "which cannot be explained by over-sampling of relatives" and a closer proximity to Poles and Czechs than Germans. The researchers however question this proximity, as the German reference population was almost exclusively West-German, and the Polish and Czech reference population had many that were part of a German minority. In a 2016 paper, Sorbs cluster autosomally again with Poles (from Poznań).

Language and culture 

The oldest known relic of Sorbian literature originated in about 1530 – the Bautzen townsmen's oath. In 1548 Mikołaj Jakubica – Lower Sorbian vicar, from the village called Lubanice, wrote the first unprinted translation of the New Testament into Lower Sorbian. In 1574 the first Sorbian book was printed: Albin Mollers’ songbook. In 1688 Jurij Hawštyn Swětlik translated the Bible for Catholic Sorbs. From 1706 to 1709 the New Testament was printed in the Upper Sorbian translation was done by Michał Frencel and in Lower Sorbian by Jan Bogumił Fabricius (1681–1741). Jan Bjedrich Fryco (a.k.a. Johann Friedrich Fritze) (1747–1819), translated the Old Testament for the first time into Lower Sorbian, published in 1790.

Other Sorbian Bible translators include Jakub Buk (1825–1895), Michał Hórnik (Michael Hornig) (1833–1894), Jurij Łušćanski (a.k.a. Georg Wuschanski) (1839–1905). In 1809 for the short period of time, there was the first printed Sorbian newspaper. In 1767 Jurij Mjeń publishes the first secular Sorbian book. Between 1841 and 1843, Jan Arnošt Smoler and Leopold Haupt (a.k.a. J. L. Haupt and J. E. Schmaler) published two-volume collection of Wendish folk-songs in Upper and Lower Lusatia. From 1842, the first Sorbian publishing companies started to appear: the poet Handrij Zejler set up a weekly magazine, the precursor of today’s Sorbian News. In 1845 in Bautzen the first festival of Sorbian songs took place. In 1875, Jakub Bart-Ćišinski, the poet and classicist of Upper Sorbian literature, and Karol Arnošt Muka created a movement of young Sorbians influencing Lusatian art, science and literature for the following 50 years. A similar movement in Lower Lusatia was organized around the most prominent Lower Lusatian poets Mato Kósyk (Mato Kosyk) and Bogumił Šwjela.

In 1904, mainly thanks to the Sorbs’ contribution, the most important Sorbian cultural centre (the Sorbian House) was built in Bautzen. In 1912, the social and cultural organization of Lusatian Sorbs was created, the Domowina Institution - the union of Sorbian organizations. In 1919 it had 180,000 members. In 1920, Jan Skala set up a Sorbian party and in 1925 in Berlin, Skala started Kulturwille- the newspaper for the protection of national minorities in Germany. In 1920, the Sokol Movement was founded (youth movement and gymnastic organization). From 1933 the Nazi party started to repress the Sorbs. At that time the Nazis also dissolved the Sokol Movement and began to combat every sign of Sorbian culture. In 1937, the activities of the Domowina Institution and other organizations were banned as anti-national. Sorbian clergymen and teachers were forcedly deported from Lusatia; Nazi German authorities confiscated the Sorbian House, other buildings and crops.

On May 10, 1945, in Crostwitz, after the Red Army’s invasion, the Domowina Institution renewed its activity. In 1948, the Landtag of Saxony passed an Act guaranteeing protection to Sorbian Lusatians; in 1949, Brandenburg resolved a similar law. Article 40 of the constitution of German Democratic Republic adopted on 7 October 1949 expressly provided for the protection of the language and culture of the Sorbs. In the times of the German Democratic Republic, Sorbian organizations were financially supported by the country, but at the same time the authorities encouraged Germanization of Sorbian youth as a means of incorporating them into the system of "building Socialism". Sorbian language and culture could only be publicly presented as long as they promoted socialist ideology. For over 1000 years, the Sorbs were able to maintain and even develop their national culture, despite escalating Germanization and Polonization, mainly due to the high level of religious observance, cultivation of their tradition and strong families (Sorbian families still often have five children). In the middle of the 20th century, the revival of the Central European nations included some Sorbs, who became strong enough to attempt twice to regain their independence. After World War II, the Lusatian National Committee in Prague claimed the right to self-government and separation from Germany and the creation of a Lusatian Free State or attachment to Czechoslovakia. The majority of the Sorbs were organized in the Domowina, though, and did not wish to split from Germany. Claims asserted by the Lusatian National movement were postulates of joining Lusatia to Poland or Czechoslovakia. Between 1945 and 1947 they postulated about ten petitions to the United Nations, the United States, Soviet Union, the United Kingdom, France, Poland and Czechoslovakia, however, it did not bring any results. On April 30, 1946, the Lusatian National Committee also postulated a petition to the Polish Government, signed by Pawoł Cyž – the minister and an official Sorbian delegate in Poland. There was also a project of proclaiming a Lusatian Free State, whose Prime Minister was supposed to be a Polish archaeologist of Lusatian origin- Wojciech Kóčka. The most radical postulates in this area (" Na swobodu so ńečeka, swobodu so beŕe!") were expressed by the Lusatian youth organization- Narodny Partyzan Łužica. Similarly, in Czechoslovakia, where before the Potsdam Conference in Prague, 300,000 people demonstrated for the independence of Lusatia. The endeavours to separate Lusatia from Germany did not succeed because of various individual and geopolitical interests.

The following statistics indicate the progression of cultural change among Sorbs: by the end of the 19th century, about 150,000 people spoke Sorbian languages. By 1920, almost all Sorbs had mastered Sorbian and German to the same degree. Nowadays, the number of people using Sorbian languages has been estimated to be no more than 40,000.

The Israeli Slavic linguist Paul Wexler has argued that the Yiddish language structure provides "compelling evidence of an intimate Jewish contact with the Slavs in the German and Bohemian lands as early as the 9th century", and has theorized that Sorbs may have been contributors to the Ashkenazic Jewish population in Europe from the same period.

Traditions 
A Shrove Tuesday festival Zapust is the most popular tradition of the Sorbs, deeply linked to the working life of the community. Traditionally, festivities would last one week ahead of the spring sowing of the fields and would feature traditional dress, parade and dancing.

Egg decorating (pisanici) is a Slavic Easter tradition maintained by Sorbs since the 17th century.

Religion 
Most current speakers of Upper-Sorbian are part of the Catholic denomination. Originally, the majority of Sorbs were Lutheran Protestants, and this was still the case going into the 20th Century (with a Protestant population of 86.9% recorded in 1900). Otherwise, the proportion of Catholics remained under 1% throughout the region of Lower Lusatia. Due to the rapid decline in language and cultural identity amongst the Protestant Sorbs - particularly during the years of the GDR - the denominational make-up of the Sorbian-speaking population of the region has now been reversed.

National symbols 

The flag of the Lusatian Sorbs is a cloth of blue, red and white horizontal stripes. First used as a national symbol in 1842, the flag was fully recognized among Sorbs following the proclamation of pan-Slavic colors at the Prague Slavic Congress of 1848. Section 25 of the Constitution of Brandenburg contains a provision on the Lusatian flag. Section 2 of the Constitution of Saxony contains a provision on the use of the coat of arms and traditional national colors of the Lusatian Sorbs. The laws on the rights of the Lusatian Sorbs of Brandenburg and Saxony contain provisions on the use of Lusatian national symbols (coat of arms and national colors).

The national anthem of Lusatian Sorbs since the 20th century is the song Rjana Łužica (Beautiful Lusatia). Previously, the songs “Still Sorbs Have Not Perished” (written by Handrij Zejler in 1840) and “Our Sorbs Rise from the Dust” (written by M. Domashka, performed until 1945) served as a hymn.

Regions of Lusatia 
There are three main regions of Lusatia that differ in language, religion, and customs.

Region of Upper Lusatia 

Catholic Lusatia encompasses 85 towns in the districts of Bautzen, Kamenz, and Hoyerswerda, where Upper Sorbian language, customs, and tradition are still thriving. In some of these places (e.g., Radibor or Radwor in Sorbian, Crostwitz or Chrósćicy, and Rosenthal or Róžant), Sorbs constitute the majority of the population, and children grow up speaking Sorbian.

On Sundays, during holidays, and at weddings, people wear regional costumes, rich in decoration and embroidery, encrusted with pearls.

Some of the customs and traditions observed include Bird Wedding (25 January), Easter Cavalcade of Riders, Witch Burning (30 April), Maik, singing on St. Martin's Day (Nicolay), and the celebrations of Saint Barbara’s Day and Saint Nicholas’s Day.

Region of Hoyerswerda (Wojerecy) and Schleife (Slepo) 

In the area from Hoyerswerda to Schleife, a dialect of Sorbian which combines characteristic features of both Upper and Lower Sorbian is spoken. The region is predominantly Protestant, highly devastated by the brown coal mining industry, sparsely populated, and to a great extent germanicized. Most speakers of Sorbian are over 60 years old.

The region distinguishes itself through many examples of Slavic wooden architecture monuments including churches and regular houses, a diversity of regional costumes (mainly worn by elderly women) that feature white-knitting with black, cross-like embroidery, and a tradition of playing bagpipes.
In several villages, residents uphold traditional festivities such as expelling of winter, Maik, Easter and Great Friday singing, and the celebration of dźěćetko (disguised child or young girl giving Christmas presents).

Region of Lower Lusatia 

There are 60 towns from the area of Cottbus belonging to this region, where most of the older people over 60 but few young people and children can speak the Lower Sorbian language; the local variant often incorporates many words taken from the German language, and in conversations with the younger generation, German is generally preferred. Some primary schools in the region teach bilingually, and in Cottbus there is an important Gymnasium whose main medium of instruction is Lower Sorbian. The region is predominantly Protestant, again highly devastated by the brown coal mining industry. The biggest tourist attraction of the region and in the whole Lusatia are the marshlands, with many Spreewald/Błóta canals, picturesque broads of the Spree.

Worn mainly by older but on holidays by young women, regional costumes are colourful, including a large headscarf called "lapa", rich in golden embroidering and differing from village to village.

In some villages, following traditions are observed: Shrovetide, Maik, Easter bonfires, Roosters catching/hunting. In Jänschwalde (Sorbian: Janšojcach) so-called Janšojki bog (disguised young girl) gives Christmas presents.

Relationship with Poland 

Bolesław I had taken control of the marches of Lusatia (Łużyce), Sorbian Meissen (Miśnia), and the cities of Budziszyn (Bautzen) and Meissen in 1002, and refused to pay the tribute to the Empire from the conquered territories. Bolesław, after the Polish-German War (1002–1018), signed the Peace of Bautzen on 30 January 1018, which made Bolesław I a clear winner. The Polish ruler was able to keep the contested marches of Lusatia and Sorbian Meissen not as fiefs, but as part of Polish territory. The Polish prince Mieszko destroyed about 100 Sorbian villages in 1030 and expelled Sorbians from urban areas, with the exception of fishermen and carpenters who were allowed to live in the outskirts.

One of the pioneers of the cooperation between the two nations was Polish historian , who lived in the 19th century and wrote the first book on Polish-Sorbian history Rys dziejów serbołużyckich (Polish title), it was published in Saint Petersburg in 1861. The book was expanded and published again in cooperation with Michał Hórnik in 1884 in Bautzen, under a new title Historije serbskeho naroda. Alfons Parczewski was another friend of Sorbs, who from 1875 was involved in Sorbs' rights protection, participating in Sorbian meetings in Bautzen. It was thanks to him, among others, that Józef Ignacy Kraszewski founded a scholarship for Sorbian students. An association of friends of Sorbian Nation was established at the University of Warsaw in 1936 (Polish full name: Towarzystwo Przyjaciół Narodu Serbo-Łużyckiego). It gathered people not only from the university. Its president was Professor Stanisław Słoński, and the deputy president was Julia Wieleżyńska. The association was a legal entity. There were three individual organizations devoted to Sorbian matters. Prołuż founded in Krotoszyn, expanded to all Poland (3000 members). It was the biggest non-communist organization that dealt with foreign affairs. This youth organization was created during the Soviet occupation and its motto was "Polish guard over Lusatia" (pl. Nad Łużycami polska straż). Its highest activity was in Greater Poland (Polish: Wielkopolska,  a district of western Poland).
After the creation of East Germany, Prołuż was dissolved, and its president historian from Poznań Alojzy Stanisław Matyniak was arrested.

After 1945, the Sorbs that historically lived in the eastern part of Lusatia (now part of Poland) were forcefully expelled by the new Polish state, as they were German citizens. Eastern Lusatia was resettled by Poles from the East and has by now lost its Sorbian identity.

Persecution

Persecution of the Sorbs under German rule became increasingly harsh throughout the 19th century. Slavs were labeled inferior to Germanic peoples, and in 1875, the use of Sorbian was banned in German schools. As a result, almost the entire Sorbian population was bilingual by the end of the 19th century.

Persecution of the Sorbs reached its climax under the Nazis, who attempted to completely assimilate and Germanize them. Their distinct identity and culture and Slavic origins were denied by referring to them as "Wendish-speaking Germans". Under Nazi rule, the Sorbian language and practice of Sorbian culture was banned, Sorbian and Slavic place-names were changed to German ones, Sorbian books and printing presses were destroyed, Sorbian organizations and newspapers were banned, Sorbian libraries and archives were closed, and Sorbian teachers and clerics were deported to German-speaking areas and replaced with German-speaking teachers and clerics. Leading figures in the Sorbian community were forcibly isolated from their community or simply arrested. The specific Wendenabteilung was established to monitor the assimilation of the Sorbs.

Towards the end of World War II, the Nazis considered the deportation of the entire Sorbian population to the mining districts of Alsace-Lorraine.

Demography
Estimates of demographic history of the Sorb population since 1450:

Sorbs are divided into two ethnographical groups:
Upper Sorbs (about 40,000 people).
Lower Sorbs, who speak Lower Sorbian (about 15–20,000 people).

The dialects spoken vary in intelligibility in different areas.

Diaspora 
During the 1840s, many Sorbian émigrés travelled to Australia, along with many ethnic Germans. The first was Jan Rychtar, a Wendish Moravian Brethren missionary who settled in Sydney during 1844. There were two major migrations of Upper Sorbs and Lower Sorbs to Australia, in 1848 and 1850 respectively. The diaspora settled mainly in South Australia – especially the Barossa Valley – as well as Victoria and New South Wales.

Many Wends also migrated from Lusatia to the United States, especially Texas.

See also 
 List of Sorbs
 Lusatia
 Polabian Slavs
 Serbs
 Wends
 Milceni
 Pavle Jurišić Šturm
 Wendish People's Party
 Wends of Texas
 List of ancient Slavic peoples and tribes

Notes

References

Sources

Further reading

 Filip Gańczak Mniejszość w czasach popkultury, Newsweek, nr 22/2007, 03.06.2007.
 W kręgu Krabata. Szkice o Juriju Brězanie, literaturze, kulturze i językach łużyckich, pod red. J.Zarka, Wydawnictwo Uniwersytetu Śląskiego, Katowice, 2002.
 Mirosław Cygański, Rafał Leszczyński Zarys dziejów narodowościowych Łużyczan PIN, Instytut Śląski, Opole 1997.
 Die Sorben in Deutschland, pod red. M.Schiemann, Stiftung für das sorbische Volk, Görlitz 1997.
 Mały informator o Serbołużyczanach w Niemczech, pod red. J.Pětrowej, Załožba za serbski lud, 1997.
 Dolnoserbske nałogi/Obyczaje Dolnych Łużyc, pod red. M.Stock, Załožba za serbski lud, 1997.
 "Rys dziejów serbołużyckich" Wilhelm Bogusławski Piotrogród 1861
 "Prołuż Akademicki Związek Przyjaciół Łużyc" Jakub Brodacki. Polska Grupa Marketingowa 2006 .
 "Polska wobec Łużyc w drugiej połowie XX wieku. Wybrane problemy", Mieczkowska Małgorzata, Szczecin 2006 .
 Wukasch, C. (2004) A Rock Against Alien Waves: A History of the Wends . Concordia University Press: Austin.
 "Sorbs," David Zersen, in Germans and the Americas: Culture, Politics and History, 3 vols., edited by Thomas Adam. ABC-CLIO, 2005.

External links 

 
 The Domowina Institution
 SERBSKE NOWINY—Sorbian newspaper
 SERBSKI INSTITUT—Sorbian history and culture
 Independent Sorbian internet magazine 
 Sorbian emigration into Australia
 Project Rastko - Lusatia, Electronic Library of Sorbian-Serbian Ties
 Texas Wendish Heritage Society
 Wendish Heritage Society of Australia

 
West Slavs
Ethnic groups in Europe
Ethnic groups in Germany
Ethnic groups in Poland
Slavic ethnic groups